Mangelia leuca is a species of sea snail, a marine gastropod mollusk in the family Mangeliidae.

Description
The length of the shell attains 15 mm, its diameter 6 mm.

(Original description) The shell is rather large for the genus, regularly fusiform, thin and translucent. It is bluish white, with a roughened surface of waxy lustre, and a shining tip of a delicate yellow tint. The spire measures about half the length of the shell. It consists of seven decidedly shouldered whorls, besides the protoconch. The aperture is long and narrow. The posterior sinus is large and nearly round, commencing at the suture and reaching to the shoulder, cutting into the top of the varlx formed by the thickening of the last transverse rib. It thus shows a thickened border with the upper edge rounded but not raised above the surface of the shell, extending farther back than the inner edge and curving strongly with the lines of growth, nearly meeting in front. From this the thin outer lip reaches far forward over the aperture, leaving a very narrow opening. Near the anterior end it is pinched in slightly, then bends abruptly backward as though cut off obliquely, revealing the entire width of the siphonal canal, and, curving a little upward, forms a slight notch before joining the columella. The edge of the lip is rounded and crimped by the termination of the revolving threads. The columella has a slight sigmoid curvature and an inconspicuous layer of enamel. The suture is distinct, undulating, slightly channelled. The concave subsutural band occupies about a third of the width of the upper whorls, and is crossed by fine indistinct lines of growth. Conspicuous, rather broad, angular, oblique ribs cross the whorls, scarcely evident on the subsutural band, but rise somewhat abruptly on its lower edge, forming a sharp shoulder at the periphery. There are eleven of these ribs on the body whorl, reaching to the base of the siphonal canal. These, with their equally broad, concave interspaces, are ornamented with about twenty-five conspicuously raised, uniform, rounded threads, pretty regularly separated, but a little crowded on the anterior end of the siphonal canal. On the penultimate whorl there are six of them, the first just above the shoulder and the last just above the
suture. The lines of growth are very indistinct. The protoconch is small, shining, consisting of three and a half regularly coiled whorls, the lower one ornamented with a peripheral keel. The entire surface of the shell is covered with minute granules, closely crowded except on the protoconch, where they are somewhat scattered and discernible only under a high magnifying power.

Distribution
This marine species occurs off North Carolina, USA.

References

External links
  Tucker, J.K. 2004 Catalog of recent and fossil turrids (Mollusca: Gastropoda). Zootaxa 682:1–1295.

leuca
Gastropods described in 1893